Muhammad Roslin bin Hashim (born 23 October 1975) is a former Malaysian badminton player. He is the elder brother of Muhd Hafiz Hashim.

Career

2004 Summer Olympics
Hashim played badminton at the 2004 Summer Olympics in men's singles, losing in the first round to the bronze medalist Soni Dwi Kuncoro of Indonesia.

BAM relationship
In 2007 he had several problems with the Badminton Association of Malaysia (BAM) and threatened to take them to court, because they forgot to enter his name for the Singapore Open and Indonesia Open, in addition to the 2006 China Open and the 2007 Malaysia Super Series.

Achievements

Southeast Asian Games 
Men's singles

Mixed doubles

BWF Grand Prix 
The BWF Grand Prix has two levels, the BWF Grand Prix and Grand Prix Gold. It is a series of badminton tournaments sanctioned by the Badminton World Federation (BWF) since 2007. The World Badminton Grand Prix sanctioned by International Badminton Federation (IBF) from 1983 to 2006.

Men's singles

  BWF Grand Prix Gold tournament
  BWF & IBF Grand Prix tournament

References

External links
 

1975 births
Living people
People from Kota Bharu
Malaysian people of Malay descent
Malaysian male badminton players
Badminton players at the 2004 Summer Olympics
Olympic badminton players of Malaysia
Badminton players at the 1998 Asian Games
Asian Games bronze medalists for Malaysia
Asian Games medalists in badminton
Medalists at the 1998 Asian Games
Competitors at the 1995 Southeast Asian Games
Competitors at the 1999 Southeast Asian Games
Competitors at the 2001 Southeast Asian Games
Competitors at the 2003 Southeast Asian Games
Southeast Asian Games gold medalists for Malaysia
Southeast Asian Games silver medalists for Malaysia
Southeast Asian Games bronze medalists for Malaysia
Southeast Asian Games medalists in badminton
World No. 1 badminton players
Malaysian Muslims